The Myponga Pop Festival was a music festival which took place on a farm near Myponga, South Australia from 30 January to 1 February 1971. Myponga Pop Festival drew approximately 15,000 people, the biggest event in Adelaide since the Beatles drew a 300,000 strong crowd in 1964. The main funder and figure in the festival organising company, Music Power, was Hamish Henry. The festival has been described as a "tribute to Henry's entrepreneurial genius". As well as organising the Myponga festival, Henry managed several of the headlining local bands, War Machine and two other Adelaide groups, Headband and Fraternity. Hamish had brought rock band Fraternity to Adelaide, South Australia and soon had them headline his Woodstock inspired festival alongside Black Sabbath.

According to Myponga: South Australia's first pop festival by Lindsay Buckland, the festival was originally to be held at Silver Lake near Mylor, South Australia. The owner of the Silver Lake site threatened court proceedings against Music Power for changing the site of the event to Myponga. As a result Alex Innocenti pulled out from the festival as an investor and organiser and was contracted to the festival for various remedial duties, not in an official decision making capacity.

Trevor Brine was the festival's booker and artist liaison. The festival was headlined by heavy metal pioneers, Black Sabbath. Cat Stevens was advertised as co-headline artist at the festival but he cancelled to perform in Los Angeles. The compere was Adrian Rawlins, who wrote of his experiences at Myponga, and other festivals, in his book Festivals in Australia: an Intimate History  (1982). Another international act was Syrius, (from Hungary, see Jackie Orszaczky).

According to Brine's assistant and ticket seller Alex Innocenti, "we went down to the farm at Myponga in Hamish's great American sports car with no roof, like movie stars.  The farmer says, `What do you guys want?' and Hamish says, `I want to buy your farm.' He gave him a $1 deposit and paid him the next week." Innocenti says he has no idea what's happened to Henry.

Australian artists included Daddy Cool, Spectrum, Fraternity, Billy Thorpe and the Aztecs, Fanny Adams, Jeff St John's Copperwine with Wendy Saddington, Company Caine and Chain; South Australian artists included  Steve Foster.

The Canberra Times correspondent reported that the "festival rocked to a close tonight after taking l days to warm up. The pop crowd, estimated at 8,000, started arriving at the 62-acre farm at Myponga early on Saturday morning. Most of them had brought plenty of alcohol and, although violence did not erupt, the atmosphere at the festival was tense at times." The promoters did not make any profit.

Author Clinton Walker in his book 'Highway to Hell: The life and death of Bon Scott' described the Myponga Festival: "With a bill boasting an exclusive appearance by Black Sabbath as well as the cream of Australia's progressive bands, Myponga - bankrolled by Hamish Henry was the biggest thing to hit Adelaide since the Beatles..."

In March 2013 Black Sabbath's Ozzy Osbourne recalled the group's debut Australian performance, "That was the Myponga Pop Festival if I remember right? Management told us we'd have an exact copy of our amplifiers there, which we thought was great, but when we got there they were nothing like our amplifiers! But you know what? You get up there and do your best and I had a good time. I remember we had a big party at the hotel and some chicks there got absolutely shit-faced and were throwing up everywhere and we had to send them home. I don't remember much on the sex front after that..."

To commemorate the 50th Anniversary of the festival a monument was erected near the original festival site on Higgs Road, Myponga. A concert was held to celebrate the 50th Anniversary of Myponga Music Festival and Fraternity at Thebarton Theatre on Thursday 18th March 2021. Original Myponga Music Festival bands Chain, Spectrum & Fraternity performed. Doug Parkinson (Fanny Adams) was also scheduled but died just days before the event.

Lineup 

(Bands are listed in the order they appeared.)

Sunday, January 30th
 Uncle Jack
 Storyville
 Monshine Jug and the String Band
 Lipp Arthur
 Daddy Cool
 Desiderata
 Spectrum
 Fanny Adams
 Lipp Caine Rock Orchestra
 Geoff Crozier's Magic Freaks
 Syrius

Monday, January 31st
 Coney Island Jug Band
 Daddy Cool
 Hippo
 Sunshine
 Company Caine
 John Graham
 Sons of the Vegetal Mother
 Margret RoadKnight
 War Machine
 Black Fire
 Fraternity
 Spectrum

Tuesday, February 1st
 Fat Angel
 Octopus
 Flying Biplane
 Pigface
 Lotus
 Chain
 Jeff St. John, Wendy Saddington, and the Copperwine
 Healing Force
 Billy Thorpe and the Aztecs
 Black Sabbath

See also

List of historic rock festivals
List of jam band music festivals

References

Rock festivals in Australia
Pop music festivals
1971 in Australia
1971 music festivals